Chuadanga-1 is a constituency represented in the Jatiya Sangsad (National Parliament) of Bangladesh since 2008 by Solaiman Haque Joarder of the Awami League.

Boundaries 
The constituency encompasses Alamdanga Upazila, Chuadanga Municipality, and five union parishads of Chuadanga Sadar Upazila: Alokdia, Kutubpur, Mominpur, Padmabila, and Shankar Chandra.

History 
The constituency was created in 1984 from the Kushtia-7 constituency when the former Kushtia District was split into three districts: Meherpur, Kushtia, and Chuadanga.

Members of Parliament

Elections

Elections in the 2010s

Elections in the 2000s

Elections in the 1990s

References

External links
 

Parliamentary constituencies in Bangladesh
Chuadanga District